The Turkmenistan Super Cup (Turkmen: Türkmenistanyň Naýbaşy Kubogy)  is an annual one-match association football competition in Turkmenistan organized by the Football Federation of Turkmenistan. This competition serves as the season opener and is played between the Ýokary Liga Champions and the Turkmenistan Cup Winners of the previous season. If a single team holds both titles, the Cup runners-up are invited.

Winners & Results

Top-Performing Clubs

References

External links
Turkmenistan - List of Cup Finals, RSSSF.com

 

Super Cup
National association football supercups